The Glentui River is a river in the Canterbury region of New Zealand. It arises on the slopes of Mount Richardson and flows south-east through the locality of Glentui and into Ashley River / Rakahuri, which exits in the Pacific Ocean. The river was earlier called Tui Creek, and the locality named from the station Glentui established by H.C.H. Knowles in 1854.

There are nature and waterfall walking tracks along the river.

See also
List of rivers of New Zealand

References

Land Information New Zealand - Search for Place Names

Rivers of Canterbury, New Zealand
Waimakariri District
Rivers of New Zealand